Criminal Brigade may refer to:

 Criminal Brigade (1947 film), a French film directed by Gilbert Gil 
 Criminal Brigade (1950 film), a Spanish film directed by Ignacio F. Iquino